Corinna Rüffer (born 11 October 1975) is a German politician of Alliance 90/The Greens who has been serving as a member of the Bundestag from the state of Rhineland-Palatinate since 2013.

Early life and education 
Born in Osnabrück, Lower Saxony, Rüffer studied political science and public law at the University of Trier (without a degree).

Political career 
In 1999 Rüffer joined the Bündnis 90/Die Grünen party. She became a member of the Bundestag in the 2013 German federal election, representing the Trier constituency. In parliament, she is a member of the Committee on Labour and Social Affairs and the Committee on Petitions. She also serves as her parliamentary group’s spokesperson for disability policy and citizens' affairs.

References

External links 

  
 Bundestag biography 

1975 births
Living people
Members of the Bundestag for Rhineland-Palatinate
Female members of the Bundestag
21st-century German women politicians
Members of the Bundestag 2021–2025
Members of the Bundestag 2017–2021
Members of the Bundestag 2013–2017
Members of the Bundestag for Alliance 90/The Greens